Boyer Bluff is a mostly ice-covered bluff,  high, at the southwest periphery of the Darley Hills in the Churchill Mountains. It was named by the Advisory Committee on Antarctic Names after David S. Boyer of the National Geographic Magazine (NGM) Foreign Editorial Staff, who was on assignment in Antarctica, 1956–57. This is just one of several features in the Darley Hills that are named for NGM staff.

References 

Cliffs of the Ross Dependency
Shackleton Coast